Tanypteryx hageni, the black petaltail, is a dragonfly of the family Petaluridae, native to the Pacific Northwest of the North America. It is one of only two members of the genus Tanypteryx. The other species lives in Japan.

References

Petaluridae
Odonata of North America
Insects described in 1879